All By Myself  is the debut solo album by the former Temptations vocalist Eddie Kendricks. It was released in 1971 on Tamla Records.

The opening track, "Let's Go Back to Day One", appeared in the Diana Ross movie Mahogany, directed by Berry Gordy.

Track listing
"Let's Go Back to Day One" (Gloria Jones, Patrice Holloway)  3:30 	
"This Used to Be the Home of Johnnie Mae" (Leonard Caston, Jr., Samual Small)  5:40 	
"I Did It All for You" (Frank Wilson, Jimmy Webb)  2:58 	
"It's So Hard for Me to Say Good-Bye" (Frank Wilson, Pam Sawyer)  3:08 
"Something's Burning" (Mac Davis)  4:27 	
"Can I" (Hal Davis, Herman Griffith)  6:12 	
"Didn't We" (Jimmy Webb)  3:09

Charts

Singles

References

External links
 Eddie Kendricks-All By Myself at Discogs.com

1971 debut albums
Eddie Kendricks albums
Tamla Records albums
Albums produced by Frank Wilson (musician)